The 1978 Middle Tennessee Blue Raiders football team represented Middle Tennessee State University as a member of the Ohio Valley Conference (OVC) during the 1978 NCAA Division I-AA football season. Led by Ben Hurt in his fourth and final year as head coach, the Blue Raiders compiled an overall record of 1–9–1 with a mark of 1–6 in conference play, placing last out of eight teams in the OVC.

Schedule

References

Middle Tennessee
Middle Tennessee Blue Raiders football seasons
Middle Tennessee Blue Raiders football